Jonah is a prophet described in the scriptures of Abrahamic religions, primarily in the Book of Jonah, as having been swallowed by a large fish.

Jonah may also refer to:

Film and television
 Jonah: A VeggieTales Movie, a 2002 American animated film
 Jonah (TV series) a 1962 Australian historical drama series
 Jonah (1982 miniseries), an Australian miniseries based on the Louis Stone novel (see below)
 Jonah (2019 miniseries), a New Zealand biographical miniseries about Jonah Lomu

Literature
 Jonah (comics), a character in The Beano
 Jonah (Goodman play), a 1942 play and musical by Paul Goodman
 Jonah (novel), a 1911 novel by Louis Stone
 Jonah (opera), a 1950 opera by Jack Beeson
 Jonah (poetry collection), a 2005 book by Peter Porter
 Jonah (Romeril musical), a 1985 musical by John Romeril
 Jonah, a 1917 poetry collection by Aldous Huxley
 Jo Nah, or Ultra Boy, a DC Comics superhero
 "Jonah" ("Jonas" in French), a 1966 short story  by Gérard Klein.

Music
 Jonah (musical), a 1985 Australian musical by John Romeril and Alan John
 "Jonah" (Breathe song), 1987
 "Jonah" (Kanye West song), 2021

People
 Jonah (given name)
 Jonah (wrestler) (born 1988), Australian professional wrestler
 Jonah of Hankou (1888–1925), bishop of Hankou of the Russian Orthodox Church Outside Russia
 Jonah of Moscow (died c. 1461), Russian Orthodox Metropolitan of Kiev and All Rus

Places
 Jenah or Jonah, a city in Iran
 Jonah, Texas, US
 Jonah Field, a large natural gas field in Sublette County, Wyoming, US

Other uses
 Jonah (Lorenzetto), a 1520 marble sculpture by Lorenzetto
 JONAH (Jews Offering New Alternatives for Healing), a Jewish organization providing conversion therapy
 Book of Jonah, in the Hebrew Bible

See also
 Jona (disambiguation)
 Jonas (disambiguation)
 Yonah (disambiguation)
 Yonas (disambiguation)
 Yunus (disambiguation)